Reung Bunheing (born September 25, 1992) is a Cambodian professional footballer who plays as a forward for Cambodian League club Visakha and the Cambodia national football team.

International career

International goals
Scores and results list Cambodia's goal tally first.

Honours

Club
National Defense Ministry
Hun Sen Cup: 2016, 2018

References

External links
 

1992 births
Living people
Cambodian footballers
Cambodia international footballers
Sportspeople from Phnom Penh
Association football forwards
Visakha FC players
Cambodian Premier League players